Thyridanthrax fenestratus is a Palearctic species of bee fly in the family Bombyliidae.
It is found throughout Europe, through Greece and Turkey, Azerbaijan, Tajikistan and across the Palearctic  to China in the East

References

External links
Van Veen

Bombyliidae
Insects described in 1814